Laval-sur-Luzège (literally Laval on Luzège) is a commune in the Corrèze department in central France.

Geography
The Luzège forms the commune's eastern boundary, then flows into the Dordogne, which forms the commune's southern boundary.

Population

See also
Communes of the Corrèze department

References

Communes of Corrèze